Vespasiano I Gonzaga, Duke of Sabbioneta (6 December 1531 – 26 February 1591) was an Italian nobleman, diplomat, writer, military engineer and condottiero. He is remembered as a patron of the arts and the founder of Sabbioneta, a town in Lombardy designed according to the Renaissance principles of the "ideal city".

He was born in Fondi, a Colonna fief in the southern Latium, the son of Isabella Colonna and the condottiero Louis Gonzaga, lord of Palazzolo, a member of a cadet branch of the House of Gonzaga, Dukes of Mantua. Soon orphaned, he was educated under his aunt Giulia Gonzaga, who had moved to Naples to escape attempts from other members of the Colonna family to kill Vespasiano in order to obtain the fiefs he had inherited from his mother.

At the age of eleven he was sent to the Spanish royal court to complete his education under King Philip II of Spain, to whom he was distantly related through mutual descent from Kings of Aragon. The latter found in Vespasiano one of his most faithful advisers, and made him a Grandee of Spain and then Viceroy of Navarre and Valencia.

In 1556 he started his major project, the construction of a new, ideal city between Mantua and Parma which he christened "Sabbioneta" ("Sandy"), as it was to rise on the sandy banks of the Po River. The project was finished in 1591. Sabbioneta had been declared an autonomous Duchy in 1577, thanks to the personal support of Vespasiano's friend Rudolf II of Habsburg, whom he had met in the Spanish court.

He died at Sabbioneta in 1591.

Marriage and Children 
Vespasiano Gonzaga married 3 times :
 Diana Folch de Cardona (1531–1559), daughter of Antonio Folch de Cardona and Beatriz de Luna.
 Anna d'Aragona y Folch de Cardona (?–1567), daughter of Alfonso de Aragón y Portugal, they had 
 Giulia (1565)
 Isabella Gonzaga (1565–1637), his heiress
 Luigi Gonzaga (1566–1580), died aged 14. Aldous Huxley claims that Vespasiano kicked Luigi to death over Luigi failing to touch his cap in the street to him. (Huxley, Collected Essays, p. 24)
 Margherita Gonzaga (1562–1618), daughter of Cesare I Gonzaga lord of Guastalla.

References

Huxley, Aldous (1960). Collected Essays. New York: Bantam Books.

1531 births
1591 deaths
16th-century Italian nobility
City founders
16th-century condottieri
Grandees of Spain
Vespasiano 01
16th-century Italian diplomats
Italian Renaissance writers
Italian male writers
Knights of the Golden Fleece
People from the Province of Latina
Viceroys of Navarre
People from Sabbioneta